Lee Soo-geun (born February 10, 1975) is a South Korean comedian

Filmography

Film

Drama

Television Shows

Videography

Music video

References 

South Korean filmographies